Gerhard Tweraser (born 29 September 1989 in Bad Ischl) is an Austrian racing driver. He has competed in such series as ADAC Formel Masters and the German Formula Three Championship. He won the 2006 Formula Lista Junior championship season.

References

External links
 
 

1989 births
Living people
People from Bad Ischl
Austrian racing drivers
German Formula Three Championship drivers
ADAC Formel Masters drivers
Formula Lista Junior drivers
Blancpain Endurance Series drivers
ADAC GT Masters drivers
Sportspeople from Upper Austria

Neuhauser Racing drivers
Lamborghini Super Trofeo drivers